Koordersiodendron is a monotypic genus of flowering plants belonging to the family Anacardiaceae. It only contains one known species, Koordersiodendron pinnatum 

Its native range is Malesia to New Guinea. It is found in the countries of Borneo, Maluku Islands, New Guinea, Philippines and Sulawesi.

The genus name of Koordersiodendron is in honour of Sijfert Hendrik Koorders (1863–1919), Dutch-Indonesian botanist and mycologist in Bogor, and herbarium director beginning in 1903. It has the following synonyms; Kokkia  and Koordersina . The Latin specific epithet of the species, pinnatum is derived from pinnatus meaning feathered.
The genus was first described and published in Meded. Lands Plantentuin Vol.19 on page 410 in 1898, and the species was first described and published in Bull. Bur. Forest. Philipp. Islands Vol.1 on page 33 in 1903.

References

Anacardiaceae
Anacardiaceae genera
Plants described in 1898
Flora of Malesia
Flora of New Guinea